The rufous-fronted thornbird (Phacellodomus rufifrons) is a species of bird in the family Furnariidae.

Distribution and habitat

It is found in Brazil, Bolivia, Argentina, Colombia, Ecuador, Paraguay, Peru, and Venezuela.  Its natural habitats are subtropical or tropical dry forest, dry savanna, subtropical or tropical dry shrubland, subtropical or tropical high-altitude shrubland, and heavily degraded former forest.

Taxonomy
The plain thornbird (Phacellodomus inornatus) was formerly considered conspecific.

References

External links

rufous-fronted thornbird
Birds of Brazil
Birds of Bolivia
Birds of Ecuador
Birds of the Pantanal
Birds of Paraguay
Birds of Peru
Birds of Venezuela
rufous-fronted thornbird
Taxonomy articles created by Polbot